Andrew Scott Black (born 20 September 1995) is a Scottish footballer who plays as a midfielder for Cowdenbeath.

He has previously played for Dundee, Forfar Athletic, Fauldhouse United, Stirling Albion, Edinburgh City, Kelty Hearts and East Kilbride.

Career
Black was with Hibernian as a youth, then moved to Dundee. He made his first professional appearance on 7 February 2015, coming on as a substitute for Dundee in a Scottish Cup tie against Celtic.

On 26 August 2015, Black moved on loan to Forfar Athletic until January 2016. Black was released by Dundee on 31 August 2016.

After stints with Fauldhouse United and Stirling Albion, Black signed for Edinburgh City in June 2018.

Kelty Hearts announced the signing of Black on 3 June 2021.

Career statistics

References

External links 
 
 

1995 births
Living people
Scottish footballers
Association football defenders
Dundee F.C. players
Forfar Athletic F.C. players
Scottish Professional Football League players
Stirling Albion F.C. players
F.C. Edinburgh players
Fauldhouse United F.C. players
Kelty Hearts F.C. players
Sportspeople from Livingston, West Lothian
Footballers from West Lothian